The PT-56 is a rectangular plastic cased Yugoslavian minimum metal anti-tank blast mine. It is very similar in appearance and size to the TMA-2, which has superseded it.

Specifications
 Length: 260 mm
 Width: 330 mm
 Weight: 7 kg
 Explosive content: 5.4 kg of TNT
 Operating pressure: 100 kg

References
 

Anti-tank mines
Land mines of Yugoslavia